Alan Mervyn Brunton (14 October 1946 – 27 June 2002) was a New Zealand poet and playwright.

Biography
Brunton was born in Christchurch and educated at Hamilton Boys' High School, the University of Auckland and Victoria University of Wellington. He was founding editor of Freed, and in 1970 Brunton moved to Europe and Asia, publishing Messengers in Blackface (1973, London). From 1974 to 1978 he co-founded  an experimental theatre group, Red Mole with his partner Sally Rodwell. He co-edited Spleen 1976–77. He lived his latter years at Island Bay, a suburb of Wellington. He died in Amsterdam in 2002 during a visit to Europe.

Works
Alan Brunton's work was interwoven between his poetry and theatre. He performed as part of the troupe in Red Mole in many venues including in the 1970s Carmen's Balcony in Wellington, New Zealand. Carmen's Balcony was a notorious nightclub run by Carmen Rupe. His colleague Arthur Baysting was performing there too and says of his work: "Alan’s political eye could be sharp and droll: “the vaudeville king of politics is calling names again on the radio … how much gin does He drink in a day?” (Sally’s Turn to Talk). On a good night, in the face of drunken calls for the live rock band or topless dancers, he could silence the packed crowds with a tender, softly spoken love song."

Black & White Anthology (1976). A 33-part sequence with an Asian setting
Oh Ravachol (1978). Red Mole
And She Said (1984). Red Mole
New Order (1986). Red Mole
Red Mole, a Sketchbook. ISBN/SKU: 9780864730930
Beyond the Oh La La Mountains (2014). Poems 1968–2002. Titus Books. 2014
Ecstasy (2001). A collection of poems for the new millennium. Bumper Books. 

Brunton has also edited and co-edited a number of publications.

References

External links
Alan Brunton at AudioCulture 
Alan Brunton on the New Zealand Electronic Poetry Website curated by Michelle Leggott 
Alan Brunton on the New Zealand Book Council website author description 

1946 births
2002 deaths
New Zealand male poets
20th-century New Zealand dramatists and playwrights
20th-century New Zealand poets
20th-century New Zealand male writers
New Zealand male dramatists and playwrights
University of Auckland alumni
Victoria University of Wellington alumni